Vojtech Čelko (born 27 July 1946, Bratislava) is a Slovak historian.

He studied at FF UK in Prague, FF UJEP in Brno. He worked in Institute of history ČSAV and Oriental institute ČSAV. He worked in "Dům Slovenské kultury" in Prague in 1985–1993 (from 1990 as director) and then he worked in "Ústav pro soudobé dějiny AV ČR".

External links
 About Vojtech Čelko 

20th-century Slovak historians
1946 births
Living people
People from Bratislava
21st-century Slovak historians